Farrenburg (also spelled Farrenberg) is an unincorporated community in New Madrid County, in the U.S. state of Missouri.

History
Farrenburg was originally spelled "Farrenberg", and under the latter name was platted in 1882 when the railroad was extended to that point. The community has the name of W. A. Farrenberg, the original owner of the site. A post office called Farrenberg was established in 1897, and remained in operation until 1918.

References

Unincorporated communities in New Madrid County, Missouri
Unincorporated communities in Missouri